William John Lyon (8 June 1878 – 1915) was a Scottish footballer who played in the Scottish Football League for Dundee, and in the Football League for Manchester City, Preston North End and Walsall.

References

1878 births
1915 deaths
Scottish footballers
English Football League players
Association football midfielders
Third Lanark A.C. players
Clachnacuddin F.C. players
Kirkintilloch Rob Roy F.C. players
Dundee F.C. players
Sunderland A.F.C. players
Walsall F.C. players
Bristol Rovers F.C. players
Manchester City F.C. players
Preston North End F.C. players
Hyde United F.C. players
Lancaster City F.C. players